Joan Vohs (July 30, 1927 – June 4, 2001) was an American model and film and television actress.

Early years
Vohs was a native of St. Albans, Queens, in New York City, the daughter of Mr. and Mrs William Vohs, who also had two younger daughters. 

She danced with The Rockettes before becoming an actress. She later danced with Agnes DeMille's troupe and became a Connover model.

Career
Vohs made her movie debut in Girls School for Columbia Pictures. She was an occasional hostess on the program Faith of Our Children. 

She appeared on several episodes of Fireside Theater and on Bachelor Father, Family Affair, Maverick, and Perry Mason, among other programs.

Personal life
Vohs married John Stephens in 1952. They had one son, William, and one daughter, Laurie. She was an active Sunday school teacher.

Death
Vohs died on June 4, 2001, of heart failure in Tarzana, California, aged 73.

Filmography

References

Bibliography
 Pitts, Michael R. Western Movies: A Guide to 5,105 Feature Films. McFarland, 2012.

External links

1927 births
2001 deaths
People from St. Albans, Queens
Female models from New York (state)
Actresses from New York City
American film actresses
American television actresses
20th-century American actresses